Quassussuup Tungaa is a district of Nuuk, the capital of Greenland. Together with the Qernertunnguit neighborhood, it is located in the northwestern part of the town, facing the Nuup Kangerlua fjord.

Transport 
Nuup Bussii provides bus services linking the district to the Nuuk Centrum.

References

Districts and neighborhoods of Nuuk